Sociedad Fomento y Cultura Minerva is a Spanish football team based in Alumbres, Cartagena, in the Region of Murcia. Founded in 2012, it plays in Tercera División – Group 13, holding home matches at Campo Municipal de Alumbres, often known as El Secante. 

Luis Franco is actually coaching the team, Ricardo Gutiérrez helps him as Second Trainer. As Physical Trainer is Isaac Vilar. Finally, as Goalkeeper Trainer is Sergio Caballero also known as 'Ryutron'.

Season to season

3 seasons in Tercera División

References

External links
La Preferente team profile 
Soccerway team profile

Football clubs in the Region of Murcia
Sports teams in the Region of Murcia
Association football clubs established in 2012
2012 establishments in Spain